Damian Cardace is a rugby league footballer who plays for Lézignan Sangliers in the French Elite One Championship. He previously played in the Super League for the Catalans Dragons, before being released in July 2015.

In 2013, Cardace played for France in the 2013 Rugby League World Cup.

He played in the 2014 European Cup and 2015 European Cup.

References

External links
Castleford Tigers profile
France profile
2017 RLWC profile

1992 births
Living people
Catalans Dragons players
France national rugby league team players
French rugby league players
Lézignan Sangliers players
Rugby league fullbacks
Rugby league wingers